Billy Bean (born  1964) is an American former Major League Baseball player who made news when he made his homosexuality public.

Billy Bean or Billy Beane may also refer to:
Billy Bean (musician) (1933–2012), American jazz guitarist
Billy Bean (footballer) (1915–1993), born Alfred Samuel Bean, English footballer
Billy Beane (born 1962), Oakland Athletics general manager and former baseball player
Billy Bean, puppet character in 1950s UK children's TV series Billy Bean and His Funny Machine

See also
Bill Beaney (born 1951), American ice hockey coach
Billy McBean (1889–1976), Australian-rules football player
Willie Bean, a dog
William Bean (disambiguation)